Ne obliviscaris (Latin "Do not forget") may refer to:

Mottos
Ne Obliviscaris, motto of the Duke of Argyll as chief of the Clan Campbell
Ne Obliviscaris, motto of the Princess Louise's Argyll and Sutherland Highlanders
Ne Obliviscaris, motto of HMS Argyll and HMS Argyll (F231)
Ne Obliviscaris, motto of various schools related to the Campbell clan, including: Campbell College, George Campbell School of Technology, Campbell Collegiate, Campbell Hall School, Albert Campbell Collegiate Institute

Other
Ne Obliviscaris: Dinna Forget, memoirs of Lady Frances Balfour, 1930
Ne Obliviscaris (band), an Australian band